United Nations Security Council Resolution 76, adopted on October 5, 1949, after receiving a cablegram from the Consular Commission at Batavia to the President of the Security Council requesting that the United Nations assume future costs of military observers in Indonesia the Council transmitted the message to the Secretary-General.

The resolution was adopted by nine votes to one (Ukrainian SSR) and one abstention from the Soviet Union.

See also
List of United Nations Security Council Resolutions 1 to 100 (1946–1953)

References
Text of the Resolution at undocs.org

External links
 

 0076
Indonesian National Revolution
 0076
 0076
1949 in Indonesia
October 1949 events